Carlos Coria (born 13 May 1961) is a retired Swiss football midfielder.

References

1961 births
Living people
Swiss people of Spanish descent
Swiss men's footballers
FC Fribourg players
FC Bulle players
Association football midfielders
Swiss Super League players